Badgers are short-legged omnivores in the family Mustelidae (which also includes the otters, wolverines, martens, minks, polecats, weasels, and ferrets). Badgers are a polyphyletic rather than a natural taxonomic grouping, being united by their squat bodies and adaptions for fossorial activity. All belong to the caniform suborder of carnivoran mammals.

The fifteen species of mustelid badgers are grouped in four subfamilies: four species of Melinae (genera Meles and Arctonyx) including the European badger, five species of Helictidinae (genus Melogale) or ferret-badger, the honey badger or ratel Mellivorinae (genus Mellivora), and the American badger Taxideinae (genus Taxidae). Badgers include the most basal mustelids; the American badger is the most basal of all, followed successively by the ratel and the Melinae; the estimated split dates are about 17.8, 15.5 and 14.8 million years ago, respectively.

The two species of Asiatic stink badgers of the genus Mydaus were formerly included within Melinae (and thus Mustelidae), but more recent genetic evidence indicates these are actually members of the skunk family (Mephitidae).

Badger mandibular condyles connect to long cavities in their skulls, which gives resistance to jaw dislocation and increases their bite grip strength. This in turn limits jaw movement to hinging open and shut, or sliding from side to side, but it does not hamper the twisting movement possible for the jaws of most mammals.

Badgers have rather short, wide bodies, with short legs for digging. They have elongated, weasel-like heads with small ears. They have black faces with distinctive white markings, grey bodies with a light-coloured stripe from head to tail, and dark legs with light-coloured underbellies.

The European badger is one of the largest; the American badger, the hog badger, and the honey badger are generally a little smaller and lighter. Stink badgers are smaller still, and ferret-badgers are the smallest of all.

Etymology 
The word "badger", originally applied to the European badger (Meles meles), comes from earlier bageard (16th century), presumably referring to the white mark borne like a badge on its forehead. Similarly, a now archaic synonym was bauson 'badger' (1375), a variant of bausond 'striped, piebald', from Old French bausant, baucent 'id.'.

The less common name brock (Old English: brocc), (Scots: brock) is a Celtic loanword (cf. Gaelic broc and Welsh broch, from Proto-Celtic *brokkos) meaning "grey". The Proto-Germanic term was *þahsuz (cf. German Dachs, Dutch das, Norwegian svintoks; Early Modern English dasse), probably from the PIE root *tek'- "to construct," so the badger would have been named after its digging of setts (tunnels); the Germanic term *þahsuz became taxus or taxō, -ōnis in Latin glosses, replacing mēlēs ("marten" or "badger"), and from these words the common Romance terms for the animal evolved (Italian tasso, French taisson—blaireau is now more common—Catalan toixó, Spanish tejón, Portuguese texugo).

A male European badger is a boar, a female is a sow, and a young badger is a cub. However, in North America the young are usually called kits, while the terms male and female are generally used for adults. A collective name suggested for a group of colonial badgers is a cete, but badger colonies are more often called clans. A badger's home is called a sett.

Classification 

The following list shows where the various species with the common name of badger are placed in the Mustelidae and Mephitidae classifications. The list is polyphyletic and the species commonly called badgers do not form a valid clade.
 Family Mustelidae
 Subfamily Melinae
 Genus Arctonyx
 Northern hog badger, Arctonyx albogularis
Greater hog badger, Arctonyx collaris
Sumatran hog badger, Arctonyx hoevenii
 Genus Meles
 Japanese badger, Meles anakuma
 Asian badger, Meles leucurus
 European badger, Meles meles
Caucasian badger, Meles canescens
 Subfamily Helictidinae
 Genus Melogale
 Burmese ferret-badger, Melogale personata
 Javan ferret-badger, Melogale orientalis
 Chinese ferret-badger, Melogale moschata
Formosan ferret-badger, Melogale subaurantiaca
 Bornean ferret-badger, Melogale everetti
 Vietnam ferret-badger, Melogale cucphuongensis
 Subfamily Mellivorinae
 Honey badger, Mellivora capensis
 Subfamily Taxidiinae:
 †Chamitataxus avitus
 †Pliotaxidea nevadensis
 †Pliotaxidea garberi
 American badger, Taxidea taxus
 Family Mephitidae
 Subfamily Mydainae
 Genus Mydaus
 Indonesian or Sunda stink badger (teledu), Mydaus javanensis
 Palawan stink badger, Mydaus marchei

Distribution 
Badgers are found in much of North America, Great Britain, Ireland and most of the rest of Europe as far north as southern Scandinavia. They live as far east as Japan and China. The Javan ferret-badger lives in Indonesia, and the Bornean ferret-badger lives in Malaysia. The honey badger is found in most of sub-Saharan Africa, the Arabian Desert, southern Levant, Turkmenistan, Pakistan and India.

Behaviour

The behaviour of badgers differs by family, but all shelter underground, living in burrows called setts, which may be very extensive.  Some are solitary, moving from home to home, while others are known to form clans called cetes.  Cete size is variable from two to 15.

They are nocturnal.

In North America, coyotes sometimes eat badgers and vice versa, but the majority of their interactions seem to be mutual or neutral.  American badgers and coyotes have been seen hunting together in a cooperative fashion.

Diet 
The diet of the Eurasian badger consists largely of earthworms (especially Lumbricus terrestris), insects, grubs, and the eggs and young of ground-nesting birds. They also eat small mammals, amphibians, reptiles and birds, as well as roots and fruit. In Britain, they are the main predator of hedgehogs, which have demonstrably lower populations in areas where badgers are numerous, so much so that hedgehog rescue societies do not release hedgehogs into known badger territories. They are occasional predators of domestic chickens, and are able to break into enclosures that a fox cannot.  In southern Spain, badgers feed to a significant degree on rabbits.

American badgers are fossorial carnivores – i.e. they catch a significant proportion of their food underground, by digging. They can tunnel after ground-dwelling rodents at speed.

The honey badger of Africa consumes honey, porcupines, and even venomous snakes (such as the puff adder); they climb trees to gain access to honey from bees' nests.

Badgers have been known to become intoxicated with alcohol after eating rotting fruit.

Relation with humans

Hunting 

Hunting badgers for sport has been common in many countries. The Dachshund (German for "badger hound") dog breed was bred for this purpose. Badger-baiting was formerly a popular blood sport. Although badgers are normally quite docile, they fight fiercely when cornered. This led people to capture and box badgers and then wager on whether a dog could succeed in removing the badger from its refuge. In England, opposition from naturalists led to its ban under the Cruelty to Animals Act of 1835 and the Protection of Badgers Act of 1992 made it an offence to kill, injure, or take a badger or to interfere with a sett unless under license from a statutory authority. The Hunting Act of 2004 further banned fox hunters from blocking setts during their chases.

Badgers have been trapped commercially for their pelts, which have been used for centuries to make shaving brushes, a purpose to which it is particularly suited owing to its high water retention. Virtually all commercially available badger hair now comes from mainland China, though, which has farms for the purpose. The Chinese supply three grades of hair to domestic and foreign brush makers. Village cooperatives are also licensed by the national government to hunt and process badgers to avoid their becoming a crop nuisance in rural northern China. The European badger is also used as trim for some traditional Scottish clothing. The American badger is also used for paintbrushes and as trim for some Native American garments.

Culling 

Controlling the badger population is prohibited in many European countries since badgers are listed in the Berne Convention, but they are not otherwise the subject of any international treaty or legislation.  Many badgers in Europe were gassed during the 1960s and 1970s to control rabies.

Until the 1980s, badger culling in the United Kingdom was undertaken in the form of gassing, allegedly to control the spread of bovine tuberculosis (bTB). Limited culling resumed in 1998 as part of a 10-year randomised trial cull, which was considered by John Krebs and others to show that culling was ineffective. Some groups called for a selective cull, whilst others favoured a programme of vaccination.  Wales and Northern Ireland are currently (2013) conducting field trials of a badger vaccination programme.  In 2012 the government authorised a limited cull led by the Department for Environment, Food and Rural Affairs.  However it was later deferred and a wide range of reasons given.  In August 2013 a full culling programme began, whereby it was expected that about 5,000 badgers would be killed over six weeks in West Somerset and Gloucestershire using a mixture of controlled shooting and free shooting (some badgers were to be trapped in cages first). The cull caused many protests, with emotional, economic and scientific reasons being cited. The badger is considered an iconic species of the British countryside and it has been claimed by shadow ministers that "The government's own figures show it will cost more than it saves...", and Lord Krebs, who led the Randomised Badger Culling Trial in the 1990s, said the two pilots "will not yield any useful information".

Food 
Although rarely eaten today in the United States or the United Kingdom, badgers were once a primary meat source for the diets of Native Americans and European colonists. Badgers were also eaten in Britain during World War II and the 1950s. In some areas of Russia, the consumption of badger meat is still widespread. Shish kebabs made from badger, along with dog meat and pork, are a major source of trichinosis outbreaks in the Altai Region of Russia. In Croatia badger meat is rarely eaten, but when it is, it is usually smoked, dried, or served in goulash. In France, badger meat was used in the preparation of several dishes, such as Blaireau au sang, and it was a relatively common ingredient in countryside cuisine. Badger meat was eaten in some parts of Spain until recently.

Pets 

Badgers are sometimes kept as pets. Keeping a badger as a pet or offering one for sale is an offence in the United Kingdom under the 1992 Protection of Badgers Act.

In popular culture 

In Europe during the medieval period, accounts of badgers in bestiaries described badgers as working together to dig holes under mountains. They were said to lie down at the entrance of the hole holding a stick in their mouths, while other badgers piled dirt on their bellies. Two badgers would then take hold of the stick in the badger's mouth, and drag the animal loaded with dirt away, almost in the fashion of a wagon. The moralizing component of Bestiaries often took precedence over their function as natural history texts, and this description of badgers most likely reflects an allegorical exemplar rather than what everyday people in the Middle Ages might or might not have believed about how badgers behave in the wild.

The 19th-century poem "The Badger" by John Clare describes a badger hunt and badger-baiting. The character Frances in Russell Hoban's children's books, beginning with Bedtime for Frances (1948–1970), is depicted as a badger. Trufflehunter is a heroic badger in the Chronicles of Narnia book Prince Caspian (1951) by C. S. Lewis.

Badger characters are featured in author Brian Jacques' Redwall series (1986–2011), they are depicted as feared warriors most often falling under the title of Badger Lord or Badger Mother.  A badger character is featured in The Immortals (1992–1996) by Tamora Pierce and "The Badger" is a comic book hero created by Mike Baron. The badger is the emblem of the Hufflepuff house of the Hogwarts School of Witchcraft and Wizardry in the J. K. Rowling's Harry Potter book series (1997–2007), it is chosen as such because the badger is an animal that is often underestimated, because it lives quietly until attacked, but which, when provoked, can fight off animals much larger than itself, which resembles the Hufflepuff house in several ways.

Many other stories featuring badgers as characters include Kenneth Grahame's children's novel The Wind in the Willows (1908), Beatrix Potter's The Tale of Mr. Tod (1912; featuring badger Tommy Brock), the Rupert Bear adventures by Mary Tourtel (appearing since 1920), T. H. White's Arthurian fantasy novels The Once and Future King (1958, written 1938–41) and The Book of Merlyn (1977), Fantastic Mr. Fox (1970) by Roald Dahl, Richard Adams's Watership Down (1972), Colin Dann's The Animals of Farthing Wood (1979), and Erin Hunter's Warriors (appearing since 2003). In the historic novel Incident at Hawk's Hill (1971) by Allan W. Eckert a badger is one of the main characters.

Badgers are also featured in films and animations: a flash video called Badgers shows a cete doing calisthenics. The 1973 Disney animated film Robin Hood depicts the character of Friar Tuck as a badger. In the Doctor Snuggles series, Dennis the handyman was a badger.

In Europe, badgers were traditionally used to predict the length of winter.

The badger is the state animal of the U.S. state of Wisconsin, though this is a reference to the state's early miners rather than the animal itself, and Bucky Badger is the mascot of the athletic teams at the University of Wisconsin–Madison. The badger is also the official mascot of Brock University in St. Catharines, Ontario, Canada; The University of Sussex, England; and St Aidan's College at the University of Durham.

In 2007, the appearance of honey badgers around the British base at Basra, Iraq, fueled rumours among the locals that British forces deliberately released "man-eating" and "bear-like" badgers to spread panic. These allegations were denied by the British army and the director of Basra's veterinary hospital.

On 28 August 2013, the PC video game Shelter was released by developers Might and Delight in which players control a mother badger protecting her cubs.

As a sub-series of the Sonic the Hedgehog franchise, Sticks the Badger is one of the main characters of the Sonic Boom series.

References

External links 

 Badgerland – The Definitive On-Line Guide to Badgers in the UK
 Durham County Badger Group 
 WildlifeOnline – Natural History of Badgers
 Badger Facts
 www.ontariobadgers.org – Information about American Badgers
 Local dutch badger group
 Badger-Coyote Associations 
 YouTube video of examples of Badger scratching trees
 

 
Mammal common names
Paraphyletic groups